Archbishop Sentamu Academy is a mixed Church of England secondary school and sixth form located in the Preston Road Estate of Kingston upon Hull, England. The school was named after John Sentamu, who, at the time, was the Archbishop of York.

History
It was first established as Estcourt High School, a technical school for girls before becoming Bilton Grange Senior High School in 1973, a comprehensive mixed school. In 1988 the school became Archbishop Thurstan Church of England Voluntary Controlled School. The school converted to academy status in 2008 and was renamed Archbishop Sentamu Academy. Rebuilding works at the school as part of the Building Schools for the Future programme were completed in 2011.

Academics
Archbishop Sentamu Academy offers GCSEs and BTECs as programmes of study for pupils, while students in the sixth form have the option to study from a range of A-levels and further BTECs. The school also has a specialism in business and enterprise.

Notable former pupils
Liam Mower, actor and dancer

References

External links

Secondary schools in Kingston upon Hull
Church of England secondary schools in the Diocese of York
Academies in Kingston upon Hull